The 10th season of the FA Women's Premier League.

National Division

Northern Division

1 - North Notts withdrew, record annulled

Southern Division

1 - Wembley Mill Hill and Queen's Park Rangers merged.

References

RSSSF

Eng
FA Women's National League seasons
Wom
1